Dathuputhran is a 1970 Indian Malayalam film,  directed and produced by Kunchacko. The film stars Prem Nazir, Sathyan, Sheela and Jayabharathi in the lead roles. The film had musical score by G. Devarajan.

Cast

Prem Nazir as Ponnachan
Sathyan as Kunjachan
Sheela as Gracy
Jayabharathi as Annakutty
Adoor Pankajam as Achamma
Alummoodan as Kothan Mathai
K. P. Ummer as Jose
Kottayam Chellappan as Police Officer
S. P. Pillai as Kunjavarachan
Ushakumari as Omana
Pankajavalli as Rahel
Kaduvakulam Antony as Paulose
Vijayasree as Vanaja
PJ Antony as Maanichan
Adoor Bhasi as Jose's father
Aranmula Ponnamma as Kunjachan's mother

AJ Abraham as Doctor

Soundtrack
The music was composed by G. Devarajan and the lyrics were written by Vayalar Ramavarma.

References

External links
 

1970 films
1970s Malayalam-language films